Odyssea is a genus of African and Arabian plants in the grass family.

The genus is named after the ancient Greek tale "The Odyssey," in allusion to the long journey the type species has been taken through nine genera before settling in this one.

 Species
 Odyssea mucronata (Forssk.) Stapf - Eritrea, Somalia, Yemen, possibly Saudi Arabia
 Odyssea paucinervis  (Nees) Stapf - Zaire, Somalia, Tanzania, Angola, Zambia, Zimbabwe, Botswana, Cape Province, Namibia, Limpopo, Mpumalanga

 formerly included
see Psilolemma 
 Odyssea jaegeri - Psilolemma jaegeri

References

Poaceae genera
Chloridoideae